Acremodontina alazon is a species of sea snails, a marine gastropod mollusc in the family Trochaclididae, the false top snails.

References

External links
 To World Register of Marine Species

alazon
Gastropods described in 1905